Panbeh Chuleh-ye Bala (also Romanized as Panbeh Chūleh-ye Bālā and Panbeh Chūleh Bālā; Panbeh Chūleh and Panbeh Chūleh Pā’īn) is a village in Rudpey-ye Shomali Rural District, in the Central District of Sari County, Mazandaran Province, Iran. At the 2006 census, its population was 725, in 181 families.

References 

Populated places in Sari County